The Grand lac de Laffrey (Great Laffrey lake) is the largest of the Laffrey lakes, located in Matheysine  23 km south of Grenoble, in the Isère département of France.

Laffrey